Robyn Sarah (born 1949, in New York City) is a Canadian poet and short story writer.

Raised in Montreal, Quebec, she was educated at McGill University and the Conservatoire de musique du Québec. She has published several volumes of poetry and short stories, and one book of essays. In addition to her writing, she has taught English literature at Champlain Regional College, and has served as a poetry editor for Cormorant Books and Porcupine's Quill.

She won a CBC Literary Award for poetry in 1990, and a National Magazine Award in 1994 for her short story "Accept My Story". Her short story collection Promise of Shelter was a shortlisted nominee for the Quebec Writers' Federation Awards in 1998, and her poetry collection My Shoes Are Killing Me won the Governor General's Award for English-language poetry in 2015.

Works

Poetry
The Space Between Sleep and Waking (1981)
Anyone Skating on That Middle Ground (1984)
Becoming Light (1987), 
The Touchstone: Poems New and Selected (1992), 
Questions about the Stars (1998)
A Day's Grace (2003), 
Pause for Breath (2009), 
My Shoes Are Killing Me (2015),

Short stories
A Nice Gazebo (1992)
Promise of Shelter (1997)

Essays
Little Eurekas: A Decade's Thoughts on Poetry (2007)

References

1949 births
20th-century Canadian poets
20th-century Canadian short story writers
21st-century Canadian poets
Anglophone Quebec people
Canadian women poets
Canadian women short story writers
Canadian women editors
Canadian editors
Writers from Montreal
Writers from New York City
American emigrants to Canada
Living people
Governor General's Award-winning poets
21st-century Canadian women writers
20th-century Canadian women writers
McGill University alumni
21st-century Canadian short story writers
20th-century Canadian essayists
21st-century Canadian essayists
Canadian women essayists